Rawhide is a hide or animal skin that has not been exposed to tanning. It is similar to parchment, much lighter in color than leather made by traditional vegetable tanning.

Rawhide is more susceptible to water than leather, and it quickly softens and stretches if left wet unless well waterproofed.

"Rawhide" laces often sold for boots or baseball gloves are made of normal tanned leather rather than actual rawhide. Rawhide is not pliable when dry and would be unsuitable for that use.

Process 
The skin from buffalo, deer, elk or cattle from which most rawhide originates is prepared by removing all fur, meat and fat. The hide is then usually stretched over a frame before being dried. The resulting material is hard and translucent. It can be shaped by rewetting and forming before being allowed to thoroughly re-dry. It can be rendered more pliable by 'working', i.e. bending repeatedly in multiple directions, often by rubbing it over a post, sometimes traditionally by chewing. It may also be oiled or greased for a degree of waterproofing.

Uses 
It is often used for objects such as whips, drumheads or lampshades, and more recently chew toys for dogs. It is thought to be more durable than leather, especially in items suffering abrasion during use, and its hardness and its shapability render it more suitable than leather for some items.

Saddles 
Rawhide is often used to cover saddle trees, which make up the foundation of a western saddle, while wet: it strengthens the wooden tree by drawing up very tight as it dries and resists the abrasion regularly encountered during stock work or rodeo sports.

Bows 
Rawhide can be used as a backing on a wooden bow.  Such a backing prevents the bow from breaking by taking a share of the tension stress. Bows made from weaker woods such as birch or cherry benefit more from a rawhide backing.

Hammers 

Soft hammers are also made with rolled rawhide dipped in shellac: these hammers are mostly used by people who work soft metals without marring it (jewelers, brass instrument repairmen, boilermakers etc.)

Shoes 
Traditional gaucho's "boots" are made with horse feet rawhide. Gauchos skin the animal and put the freshly skinned hides on their feet like socks, where they are left to dry, taking the user's feet shape. Like moccasins they are soft-soled. Like ancient Roman cothurnus, the rudimentary boots have no toe box and do not cover the toes completely.

Dog chew 
It is quite effective for training dogs and also satisfies their natural desire for meat. Some veterinarians discourage the giving of rawhide to dogs because of the animal’s inability to digest the rawhide properly and its tendency to swell in the stomach; that is much less of a problem in dogs that bite off smaller pieces and do not try to swallow the rawhide whole.

Garrotte / Medical uses 
Wet rawhide has been used by some earlier cultures as a means of torture or execution, gradually biting into or squeezing the flesh of body parts it encloses as it dries. An example is buskin.  On the other hand, it has also been used in the context of medicine by First Nations peoples, and other groups such as the Sioux Nation: wet rawhide would be wrapped around a long bone fracture and it would dry, slowly setting the bone; the dried rawhide then served to support the fracture, similar to how a plaster cast does today.

References 

Leather
ru:Сыромятная кожа